Taylorilygus is a genus of plant bug in the family Miridae.

Genera
Species within this genus include:
 Taylorilygus apicalis
 Taylorilygus pallidulus
 Taylorilygus simonyi

References

Miridae genera
Mirini